East! is the third album by guitarist Pat Martino recorded in 1968 and released on the Prestige label.

Reception

AllMusic's Scott Yanow awarded the album 4½ stars stating "Despite the title and the cover of this CD reissue (which makes it appear that the performances are greatly influenced by music of the Far East), the style played by guitarist Pat Martino's quartet is very much in the hard bop tradition. Martino was already developing his own sound and is in excellent form... It's a good example of Pat Martino's playing in his early period".

The authors of the Penguin Guide to Jazz Recordings wrote: "East! offers some of Martino's clearest and most articulate soloing against a straightforward rhythm section."

Writing for Stereophile, Wes Phillips commented: "if you've never heard East!... hie thee to the music retailer of your choice and pick up this essential classic. It's great jazz played by a god among guitarists."

Track listing 
 "East" (Tyrone Brown) - 12:47     
 "Trick" (Pat Martino) - 6:59     
 "Close Your Eyes" (Bernice Petkere) - 6:10     
 "Park Avenue Petite" (Benny Golson) - 5:50     
 "Lazy Bird" (John Coltrane) - 6:28

Personnel 
Pat Martino - guitar
Eddie Green - piano
Ben Tucker - bass, tambourine
 Tyrone Brown - bass (track 1)
Lenny McBrowne - drums

Production
Don Schlitten - producer
Richard Anderson - engineer

References 

Pat Martino albums
1968 albums
Prestige Records albums
Albums produced by Don Schlitten